Gulfscapes Magazine was a lifestyle magazine for those who live or vacation along the Gulf coast. The magazine emphasized home design and travel. Articles offered information on home interiors; coastal recreation; food; travel destinations; and style. The magazine was created in 2001 in Port Aransas, TX by Victoria Munt Rogers.

Publication editorial and coverage included the five states that border the Gulf of Mexico: Alabama, Florida, Louisiana, Mississippi and Texas.

Standard sized, 8.375 x 10.875, the magazine was printed using a web offset process in full colour, and used 'perfect-binding'.

Distribution included a pre-paid subscription base, targeted mail-outs and retail sales in more than 600 locations within HEB, Super Wal-Marts, Rouses, Publix, Barnes&Noble, Hastings and IGA. The magazine was also sold on Amazon.com. 

Magazines were sold in 11 states including: Texas, Alabama, Oklahoma, Louisiana, Arkansas, Florida, Mississippi, Georgia, New Mexico, Illinois and Tennessee.

, the magazine was no longer published.

Notes

References 
 New Orleans Times Picayune article on 2009 Great American Seafood Cook-Off with interview of Gulfscapes Magazine publisher
 New Orleans Times Picayune website, NOLA.com article on 2008 Great American Seafood Cook-Off listing Gulfscapes Magazine as sponsor
 Louisiana Seafood Promotion and Marketing Board Website Listing Founder Bio
 UPC Database 
  Trademark

External links
 Gulfscapes Magazine Website
  Digital Sample

Defunct magazines published in the United States
Lifestyle magazines published in the United States
Magazines established in 2001
Magazines with year of disestablishment missing
Magazines published in Texas
Tourism magazines